Raphael Patrick Keyes was an Irish Fianna Fáil politician.

He was born in Cork, and was a cinema proprietor when elected to the Oireachtas. During the Irish War of Independence he was captain of the Bantry company of the fifth battalion of Irish Republican Army (IRA) in West Cork. 

He was first elected to Dáil Éireann as a Fianna Fáil Teachta Dála (TD) for the Cork West constituency at the 1932 general election. He was lost his seat at the 1933 general election but was elected to the Seanad at a by-election on 2 January 1934.

References

Year of birth missing
Year of death missing
Fianna Fáil TDs
Fianna Fáil senators
Members of the 7th Dáil
Members of the 1931 Seanad
Members of the 1934 Seanad
Politicians from County Cork